The White Horse Inn (originally Im weißen Rößl) is a 1960 Austrian-West German musical film directed by Werner Jacobs and starring Peter Alexander, Waltraut Haas and Adrian Hoven. It is based on the 1930 operetta ''The White Horse Inn by Ralph Benatzky and Robert Stolz

The film's sets were designed by the art directors Willy Schatz, Wolf Englert and Sepp Rothaur. It was shot at the Bergland Studios in Wels in Upper Austria and on location in St. Wolfgang.

Cast
Peter Alexander as Leopold Brandmeyer
Waltraut Haas as Josepha Vogelhuber
Adrian Hoven as Dr. Siedler
Karin Dor as Brigitte Giesecke
Estella Blain as Klärchen Hinzelmann
Gunther Philipp as Sigismund Sülzheimer
Werner Finck as Prof. Hinzelmann
Erik Jelde as Wilhelm Giesecke
Frithjof Vierock as Piccolo Franzl
Hugo Lindinger as mayor
Rudolf Carl as Anton
Ruth Winter as Mirzl
Raoul Retzer as Feuerwehrhauptmann
Hanita Hallan as Verena-Sister
Fritz Heller as doorman
Rut Rex as Verena-Sister
Fritz Lafontaine

References

External links

1960 musical comedy films
1960 romantic comedy films
Austrian musical comedy films
Austrian romantic comedy films
German musical comedy films
German romantic comedy films
West German films
German films based on plays
Films based on adaptations
Films based on operettas
Operetta films
Films directed by Werner Jacobs
Remakes of German films
Films set in Austria
Films set in restaurants
1960s romantic musical films
Constantin Film films
1960s German-language films
1960s German films